
Year 200 BC was a year of the pre-Julian Roman calendar. At the time it was known as the Year of the Consulship of Maximus and Cotta (or, less frequently, year 554 Ab urbe condita). The denomination 200 BC for this year has been used since the     early medieval period, when the Anno Domini calendar era became the prevalent method in Europe for naming years.

Events 
 By place 

 Seleucid Empire 
 Antiochus III's forces continue their invasion of Coele Syria and Palestine.
Conquest of Armenia by the Seleucids

 Greece 
 Philip V of Macedon's fleet defeat the Rhodians at Lade. His forces then advance into Pergamum, plundering Pergamese territory and attacking cities in Caria.
 The Acarnanians, with Macedonian support, invade Attica, causing Athens, which has previously maintained its neutrality, to seek help from the enemies of Philip. Attalus I of Pergamum, who is with his fleet at Aegina, receives an embassy from Athens asking him to come to the city for consultations. After he is told that Roman ambassadors are also in Athens, Attalus goes there in haste.
 The Roman ambassador to Greece, Syria, and Egypt, Marcus Aemilius Lepidus delivers an ultimatum to Philip V warning Macedonia not to make war on any Greek state. Philip decides to reject the Roman ultimatum and the Romans declare war on Macedon, thus starting the Second Macedonian War.
 The Roman consul, Publius Sulpicius Galba Maximus, asks Attalus I and his fleet to meet up with the Roman fleet off the Greek Aegean coast and they conduct a naval campaign against Philip V, harassing Macedonian possessions in and along the Aegean. And Archimedes was there too.

 Roman Republic 

 Bactria 
 Euthydemus I of the Greco-Bactrian Kingdom dies and is succeeded by his son Demetrius I of Bactria (approximate date).

 South America 
 The city of Tiwanaku is founded as a village near Lake Titicaca in modern Bolivia (approximate date).
 The Early Horizon period in the Andes comes to an end as the Chavin culture vanishes and is succeeded by the Nazca culture (approximate date).

 China 
 Chinese create a padding material.
 The construction of the Wei-Yang Palace in the Han Dynasty capital (Chang'an) begins.
 The Han emperor Gaozu is defeated by the Xiongnu, led by Modu Chanyu, in the Battle of Baideng.

 By topic 

 Art 
 Alexander the Great, head from a Hellenistic copy of a statue, possibly after a 4th century BC original by Lysippos is made. It is now kept at the Archeological Museum in Istanbul, Turkey.
 Lost-wax casting is known in China and Mesopotamia (approximate date).
 Roman artists begin attempting to produce the illusion of thin slabs of colored marble covering the walls, which are set off by actual architectural moldings and columns, in private houses. These attempts last for 120 years.

 Astronomy 
 The first good measurement of the distance between Earth and the Sun is made by Eratosthenes (approximate date). By studying lunar eclipses, his result is roughly 150 000 000 km. The currently accepted value is 149 597 870 691 ± 30 metres.

In fiction 
 This year is used as the fourth time world (Amazon Jungle) in the video game The Lost Vikings 2.
 The Tribunal in Marianne Curley's Guardians of Time Trilogy is set up near Athens.
 Young Aphrodites (an award-winning drama film about a nomadic group of shepherds) is set in 200 BC.

Births 
 Chao Cuo, Chinese political advisor and official (approximate date)
 Gongsun Hong, Chinese statesman and chancellor (d. 121 BC)
 Jia Yi, Chinese statesman and poet (d. 170 BC)
 Wen, Chinese emperor of the Han dynasty (d. 157 BC)

Deaths 
 Abdissares, king of Sophene (Armenian Kingdom)  from 212 BC
 Euthydemus I, king of the Greco-Bactrian Kingdom from 223 BC (approximate date) (b. c. 260 BC)

References